Frederick Augustus Wolters (June 14, 1904 – December 29, 1990) was an American field hockey player who competed in the 1932 Summer Olympics.

In 1932 he was a member of the American field hockey team, which won the bronze medal. He played one match as back.

He was born in San Francisco, California and died in San Leandro, California.

External links
 
profile

1904 births
1990 deaths
American male field hockey players
Field hockey players at the 1932 Summer Olympics
Olympic bronze medalists for the United States in field hockey
Medalists at the 1932 Summer Olympics